John Canning & Co., formerly John Canning Studios, is a historic building restoration and conservation company located in Cheshire, Connecticut, led by David Riccio and John Canning. Working with government, institutional, sacred, commercial, theater, and residential clients, the company specializes in the interior restoration of decorative finishes, ornamental and flat plaster, period, and new design.

The studio’s services include consulting and consultation services such as: Historic Paint Analysis, Plaster Conditions Survey, Conservation and Restoration of decorative finishes and murals, New Design & Artwork, and Project Management and Planning. Traditional methods and materials  utilized include: Decorative Paint (stencil, stripe, faux stone (marbling), woodgraining, trompe l’oeil, and grisaille), Plaster (ornamental; running mould; stabilization, 3-coat plaster, sound dampening techniques), Wood (cleaning; repair; conservation-grade coatings; new furnishings in complementary style), Stone (cleaning; repair; polishing), and Gilding (silver leaf; gold leaf; aluminum and other alloys; glazing; exterior gold leaf)

History 
After studying at the Scottish Decorative Trade Institute, the Stow College of Building in Glasgow, and the Glasgow School of Art, John Canning served a five-year apprenticeship as a church decorator, developing artistic skills and replicating old-world techniques and materials. After his apprenticeship, he opened a studio in Glasgow as a member of the London City & Guilds. Canning emigrated from Scotland to the United States in the early 1970s and opened a studio in Connecticut, coinciding with the growing historic preservation movement. The company was incorporated in 1977 and has grown from a small workshop to a large restoration studio.

John Canning has been recognized by the American Institute of Architects, which has appointed him as an honorary AIA member. He is also a Professional Associate of the American Institute for Conservation of Historic & Artistic Works (AIC).

The company is managed by John Canning, David Riccio, and Dorothea Canning-Hennessey. Recent projects include the Shrine of Our Lady of Guadalupe, a new church in La Crosse, Wisconsin, designed by Duncan Stroik; Hulihe'e Palace on the Big Island of Hawaii, involving restoration of lime plaster; and reinstating decorative finishes at the Basilica of St. John the Evangelist in Stamford, Connecticut.

Significant projects 

Academy of Music – Philadelphia, Pennsylvania
National Building Museum - Washington, DC
Hendricks County Court House - Danville, Indiana
Isabella Stewart Gardner Museum - Boston, Massachusetts
Warner Theatre - Erie, Pennsylvania
Stadium Theatre - Woonsocket, Rhode Island
Hill Auditorium, University of Michigan - Ann Arbor, Michigan
The Culinary Institute of America - Hyde Park, New York
West End Collegiate Church - New York, New York
Radio City Music Hall - New York, New York
Grand Central Terminal - New York, New York
Iowa State Capitol – Des Moines, Iowa
Connecticut State Capitol - Hartford, Connecticut
Michigan State Capitol - East Lansing, Michigan
Pennsylvania State Capitol - Harrisburg, Pennsylvania
Rhode Island State Capitol - Providence, Rhode Island
San Francisco City Hall – San Francisco, California
Massachusetts State House, Hall of Flags - Boston, Massachusetts
War Memorial Opera House - San Francisco, California
US Treasury Building - Washington, DC
United States Capitol - Washington, DC
Mellon Auditorium - Washington, DC
Boston Public Library - McKim Building, Boston, Massachusetts
Scottish Rite Masonic Temple - Washington, DC
Sterling Law Library - Yale University - New Haven, Connecticut
Sterling Memorial Library - Yale University - New Haven, Connecticut
Widener Library – Harvard University – Cambridge, Massachusetts
Interstate Commerce Commission & US Customs House - Washington, DC
Battell Chapel - Yale University - New Haven, Connecticut
Federal Hall National Memorial - New York, New York
US Bankruptcy Courthouse – Little Rock, Arkansas
Brister Library, University of Memphis – Memphis, Tennessee
Connecticut Old State House - Hartford, Connecticut
GSA/National Capitol Region - Washington, DC
Medinah Country Club - Medinah, Illinois
M.I.T. – Massachusetts Institute of Technology, Cambridge, Massachusetts
Mohegan Sun Casino Addition - Uncasville, Connecticut
Trinity Church, Copley Square - Boston, Massachusetts
Luzerne County Courthouse -Wilkes-Barre, Pennsylvania

References

External links
 

People from Cheshire, Connecticut
21st-century American architects
American designers
New Classical architects